Dogtrot Lake is a 15-acre lake in Cook County, Minnesota which is tributary to the Poplar River. Dogtrot Lake reaches a maximum depth of 24 feet in a depression just south of the mouth of the stream leading to Slip Lake. Dogtrot lake is accessible through portages to Bulge Lake and Slip Lake. A fisheries survey turned up populations of walleye, northern pike, yellow perch, and white suckers.

References

Lakes of Cook County, Minnesota
Lakes of Minnesota
Superior National Forest